Maximovka is a rural locality (a village) and the administrative centre of Maximovksky Selsoviet, Sterlitamaksky District, Bashkortostan, Russia. The population was 293 as of 2010. There are 3 streets.

Geography 
Maximovka is located 49 km west of Sterlitamak (the district's administrative centre) by road. Saratovka is the nearest rural locality.

References 

Rural localities in Sterlitamaksky District